(born January 1, 1940) is a Japanese aikido instructor currently living in the Japan. He is an 8th dan ranked Aikikai aikido master teacher. Takeda is among the few living people who studied directly under aikido founder Morihei Ueshiba.

Takeda began training at the Aikikai Hombu Dojo in 1960. During his time there, he trained with master teachers including Kisshomaru Ueshiba, Sadateru Arikawa, Hiroshi Tada and Nobuyoshi Tamura. His primary teacher was Seigo Yamaguchi.

Aikido Kenkyukai International

 Kenkyukai International was started by Takeda as a way to further explore Aikido. The word "kenkyukai" translates to roughly mean "research group". There are currently AKI dojos in Japan, Australia, Indonesia, New Zealand, Canada, USA, Chile, Peru, Uruguay, England, Germany, France, Croatia, and Tanzania.

References

External links
Takeda Dojo
Aikido Kenkyukai Santa Barbara
Aikido Kenkyukai Los Angeles
 Fudoshin AiKi Dojos Australia. Chicko Xerri Sensei.Senior  instructor
Aikido Fudoshin Warrior Brisbane
Daishizen Dojo, AKI France

Living people
Japanese aikidoka
1940 births